Lindsey Nelson (born November 18, 1985) is an American former professional tennis player.

Biography
A right-handed player from California, Nelson attended Villa Park High School in Orange County, before going on to play college tennis for the USC Trojans.

Nelson was a two-time singles runner-up in the NCAA singles championships while playing for the Trojans and was the 2007 Pac-10 singles champion. She is a graduate of Mississippi College School of Law.

Professional career
Nelson won her first professional title in 2006, when she teamed up with Anne Yelsey to win the doubles at College Park, a top category $75,000 ITF tournament. As a singles player, Nelson had a win that year over top 100 ranked Meng Yuan in Stanford qualifying.

In 2007 she took part in the qualifying draw for the US Open and qualified for Indian Wells, by beating Abigail Spears and Stéphanie Dubois. She was beaten in the first round at Indian Wells by Croatian wildcard Mirjana Lučić.

ITF finals

Doubles: 4 (2–2)

References

External links
 
 

1985 births
Living people
American female tennis players
USC Trojans women's tennis players
Tennis people from California
Sportspeople from Riverside, California